Paeanius was a late Roman Empire historian, author of a translation into Greek language of the Latin Breviarium historiae Romanae, the historical work of Eutropius.

The Breviarium was completed by Eutropius within 369: Paeanius' translation appeared before 380. The Breviarium was a compendium of ancient Roman history, used both as a textbook in schools and as a fast course on Roman history for the higher social classes (it was dedicated to Emperor Valens): Paeanius' translation allowed Greek-speaking people to have a graceful version of this compendium.

The translation was first published in print in 1590 by Friedrich Sylburg in his collection of minor Greek writers of Roman history. Later editions of Eutropius often included Paeanius' metaphrasis. The translation was also printed on its own for school use.

Bibliography 
 John J. Winkler, Gordon Willis Williams, Later Greek literature, CUP Archive, 1982, pp. 189–192.

External links 
 1590 editio princeps of Paeanius
 1703 Oxford edition of Eutropius and Paeanius
 A 1780 schoolbook edition

Late Antique writers
Greek-language historians from the Roman Empire
Latin–Greek translators